The seventh season of the Canadian reality competition show Top Chef Canada was broadcast on Food Network in Canada. It is the Canadian spin-off of Bravo's hit show Top Chef. The program takes place in Toronto, and is hosted by Eden Grinshpan.  Season seven features 14 chefs of various backgrounds considered to be the next generation of culinary stars in Canada.

Contestants
14 chefs competed in season 8. Contestants are listed in the alphabetical order of their surnames.

Tania Ganassini, 31, Chef/Owner Staff Meal, Niagara on the Lake, ON
Takeshi Horinoue, 37, Chef/Partner Lavandaria Restaurant, Montreal, QC
Benet Hunt, 28, Executive Chef Ayden Kitchen & Bar,  Saskatoon, Saskatchewan
Hayden Johnston, 29, Chef De Cuisine Richmond Station, Thunder Bay, Ontario, ON
Sebastien LaFramboise, 31, Executive Chef District Saint-Joseph, Quebec City, QC
Renée Lavallée, 43, Chef/Owner The Canteen & Little C, Dartmouth, 
Paul Moran, 31, Executive Chef Tofino Resort & Marina, Tofino, BC
Dennis Peckham, 41, Chef/Owner Fraiche Sheet Foods, Port Moody, BC
Phil Scarfone, 33, Head Chef Nightingale, Vancouver, BC
Erin Smith, 32, Executive Sous Chef, Toronto, ON
Max Straczek, 32, Executive Chef, Vancouver, BC
Wallace Wong, 27, Chef/Owner Six Pack Chef, Mississauga, ON

Contenders
Alexei Boldireff, 25, Executive Chef Baijiu, Edmonton, Alberta 
Paul Kim, 33, Chef/Owner Doma, Toronto, ON

Contestant Progress 

 These three chefs were brought as "competitors" in episode 1 to find the final member of the cast.  Benet cooked his way into the competition, while Alexei and Paul K. were eliminated.
 Phil won immunity in this quickfire and was automatically safe from elimination.

 (WINNER) The chef won the season and was crowned Top Chef.
 (RUNNER-UP) The chef was a runner-up for the season.
 (WIN) The chef won that episode's Elimination Challenge.
 (HIGH) The chef was selected as one of the top entries in the Elimination Challenge, but did not win.
 (IMMUNE) The chef was immune from elimination, and exempted from cooking during this Elimination Challenge.
 (LOW) The chef was selected as one of the bottom entries in the Elimination Challenge, but was not eliminated.
 (OUT) The chef lost that week's Elimination Challenge and was out of the competition.
 (IN) The chef neither won nor lost that week's Elimination Challenge. They also were not up to be eliminated.

Episodes

References

Canada, Season 7
2019 Canadian television seasons
2020 Canadian television seasons